Kandholhudhoo (Dhivehi: ކަނދޮޅުދޫ) is one of the inhabited islands of Raa Atoll in the Maldives.

The island was destroyed during the tsunami of 2004, and the inhabitants of the island were relocated to R.Dhuvaafaru. In 2014, the island was repopulated by a family of fishermen. 

Islands of the Maldives

They were given free homes to live in by policemen.